Ricardo Norberto Calvo Manzano (born ) is a Cuban male volleyball player. He was part of the Cuba men's national volleyball team at the 2014 FIVB Volleyball Men's World Championship in Poland. He played for Villa Clara. He didn't play in the Rio Olympics in 2016, because he was one of six players of the Cuban national volleyball team that were suspected of committing aggravated rape in July 2016 in Tampere, Finland. In September 2016 he was sentenced to five years in prison.

Clubs
 Villa Clara (2014-2016)

References

1996 births
Living people
Cuban men's volleyball players
Cuban people imprisoned abroad
Cuban people convicted of rape
Prisoners and detainees of Finland
2016 crimes in Finland
Expatriates in Finland